
Gmina Józefów nad Wisłą is an urban-rural gmina (administrative district) in Opole Lubelskie County, Lublin Voivodeship, in eastern Poland.

History

Prior to the Holocaust, between 800 and 1,000 Jews lived in the town. There were two labor camps established for Jews, located in the synagogue and at the school building. 300 slave laborers worked on construction of embankments in the village of Rybitwy, which culminated in March 1942. From May to October 1941, Polish, Austrian and German Jews worked in slave labor at the school building. On May 9, 1942, the population of Józefów ghetto was sent to Opole Lubelskie, from where they were sent to the death camp at Sobibór.

Villages
Apart from the town of Józefów nad Wisłą, Gmina Józefów nad Wisłą contains the villages and settlements of Basonia, Boiska-Kolonia, Bór, Chruślanki Józefowskie, Chruślanki Mazanowskie, Chruślina, Chruślina-Kolonia, Dębniak, Graniczna, Idalin, Kaliszany-Kolonia, Kolczyn, Łopoczno, Mariampol, Mazanów, Miłoszówka, Niesiołowice, Nieszawa, Nieszawa-Kolonia, Nietrzeba, Owczarnia, Pielgrzymka, Pocześle, Prawno, Rybitwy, Spławy, Stare Boiska, Stare Kaliszany, Stasin, Stefanówka, Studnisko, Ugory, Wałowice, Wałowice-Kolonia and Wólka Kolczyńska.

Neighbouring gminas
Gmina Józefów nad Wisłą is bordered by the gminas of Annopol, Dzierzkowice, Łaziska, Opole Lubelskie, Solec nad Wisłą, Tarłów and Urzędów.

References

 Polish official population figures 2006

Jozefow nad Wisla
Opole Lubelskie County